John Ramsay Bryce Muir (30 September 1872 – 4 May 1941) was a British historian, Liberal Party politician and thinker who made a significant contribution to the development of liberal political philosophy in the 1920s and 1930s through his work on domestic industrial policy and his promotion of the international policy of interdependency.

Early life and education
Muir was born at Otterburn, Northumberland, the oldest of five children of a Reformed Presbyterian minister. He was educated privately in Birkenhead, then at University College, Liverpool, where he gained a first in history and then at Balliol College, Oxford, where he gained firsts in Greats and modern history.

Academic career
In 1898 Muir became an assistant lecturer in history at the University of Manchester and the following year he was appointed lecturer in history at Liverpool. From 1906 until 1913, he was professor of history at Liverpool when he resigned to take up a visiting lectureship at the University of Punjab in India (1913–14). On return to England he became professor of modern history at the University of Manchester. Between 1917 and 1919 he was a member of a commission investigating Calcutta University and Indian post-secondary education. He ended his academic career in 1921 and embarked full-time on political work.

Liberalism and politics
While at Manchester, Muir had become active in the Manchester Liberal Federation and this sparked his interest in industrial, economic and social reform. He published the book Liberalism and Industry in 1920 and in 1921 he was one of the founders of the Liberal Summer Schools, an annual, week-long, residential school to promote interest in the party and to develop innovative policies. The schools were held in alternate years at Cambridge and Oxford until 1939. The schools produced the Liberal ‘coloured books’ on industrial and social questions, most famously Britain's Industrial Future (the "Yellow Book"), and were a source of ideas for progressives in politics. Muir was also a prominent Liberal writer contributing frequently to The Nation and the Weekly Westminster. During the 1930s, he edited the Westminster Newsletter, a weekly commentary on Liberal Party affairs.

Muir stood for Parliament eight times in all in the Liberal interest between 1922 and 1935. He was elected at the 1923 general election as Member of Parliament (MP) for Rochdale in Lancashire, having been unsuccessful in that constituency at the 1922 general election However he was defeated at the 1924 election. He stood for Parliament again at five further elections, without success:
 1926: by-election for the Combined English Universities
 1929 general election: Rochdale
 1931: by-election in Scarborough & Whitby
 1931 general election: Louth
1935 general election: Scarborough and Whitby
 
Muir was also a leading figure in the National Liberal Federation (NLF), being its chairman from 1931 to 1933 and president from 1933 to 1933.  He was a driving spirit behind the party reorganisation of 1936, and briefly (in 1936) acted as vice-president of the new Liberal Party Organization (LPO). From 1936 until his death he chaired the education and propaganda committee of the LPO. He was a key contributor to the Liberal policy review of 1934 and principal author of its report ‘The Liberal Way’.  Although Muir was associated closely with the progressive ideas coming out of the Liberal Summer Schools, the radical solutions for unemployment, industrial and social reform which were inspired by Maynard Keynes, Lloyd George and William Beveridge, he was also something of a classical Liberal too. He was particularly constant over Free Trade, which he always supported, and took a paternal view of Imperial and Colonial questions, in which Britain's duties to its colonies took centre stage with an emphasis on trusteeship.

During the Second World War, Muir was a volunteer writer and lecturer for the Ministry of Information. He never married or had children and died at his home in Pinner, Middlesex, on 4 May 1941 aged 68.

Bibliography
History of Municipal Government in Liverpool (joint with others), 1906
History of Liverpool, 1907
Peers and Bureaucrats, 1910
Atlas of Modern History, 1911
Philips' new historical atlas for students (joint with others), 1911
Britain's Case Against Germany, 1915
Making of British India, 1915
Nationalism and Internationalism, 1916
The Expansion of Europe, 1917
The Character of the British Empire, 1917
National Self-Government, 1918
Liberalism and Industry: Towards a Better Social Order, 1920
History of the British Commonwealth, Volume I, 1920
History of the British Commonwealth, Volume II, 1922
Politics and Progress: A Survey of the Problems of Today, 1923
America the Golden, 1927
British History, 1928
Robinson the Great, 1929
How Britain is Governed, 1930
Protection versus Free Imports, 1930
The Political Consequences of the Great War, 1931
The Interdependent World and its Problems, 1932
The Faith of a Liberal, 1933
A Brief History of Our Own Times, 1934
The Record of the National Government, 1936
Future for Democracy, 1939
Civilisation and Liberty, 1940
Ramsay Muir: An Autobiography and Some Essays (edited by Stuart Hodgson), 1943

See also 
 List of Liberal Party (UK) MPs

References

Bibliography

F. W. S. Craig: British parliamentary election results 1918-1949, Parliamentary Research Services, Chichester, 1969

Richard Grayson: Entries on Muir in Dictionary of Liberal Thought, Brack & Randall (eds.), Politico's, 2007 and Dictionary of Liberal Biography, Brack et al. (eds.), Politico's, 1998
Ramsay Muir: An autobiography and some essays, ed. S. Hodgson, Lund Humphries,1943
Anne Moore: Entry on Liberal Summer Schools in Dictionary of Liberal Thought, Brack & Randall (eds.), Politico's, 2007
D. M. Cregier: Chiefs without Indians, University Press of America, 1982
T. Wilson: The downfall of the liberal party, 1914–1935, Cornell UP,1966
Richard Grayson: Liberals, International Relations and Appeasement, Frank Cass, 2001

External links 
 
 https://web.archive.org/web/20090706125232/http://www.liberalhistory.org.uk/item_single.php?item_id=34&item=biography Biography of Muir on the website of the Liberal Democrat History Group
 
 Ministry of Information pages at the National Archives
 
 

1872 births
Alumni of the University of Liverpool
Alumni of Balliol College, Oxford
Academics of the Victoria University of Manchester
Chairs of the Liberal Party (UK)
Presidents of the Liberal Party (UK)
Liberal Party (UK) MPs for English constituencies
UK MPs 1923–1924
1941 deaths
Members of the Parliament of the United Kingdom for Rochdale
Academics of the University of Liverpool
Academic staff of the University of the Punjab
People from Otterburn, Northumberland